Talking Scotland was a Scottish social affairs television series broadcast on STV in Northern and Central Scotland. 

The series was produced in conjunction with the Scottish Executive and broadcast each weekday at approximately 4:58am, 3:58pm and 6:28pm, the programme also aired at 11:03pm on Monday nights when Scotsport was on air.

The issues highlighted during Talking Scotland's run included:

Alcohol
Anti-Social Behaviour
Better Renting
Biodiversity
Child Protection on the Internet
Children's Hearings
Children's Traffic Club
Determined to Succeed
Disability
Domestic Abuse
Drink Driving
Drugs & Drug Driving
E.coli 0157
Family Support Groups (Drugs)
Fire Safety
Health Service
Healthy Living
Internet

In-Car Safety
Mental Health
NHS24 & GP Out Of Hours
Organ Donation
The Pneumococcal Jab Race
Smoking in Public Places
Social Work/Care
Speeding
Tailgating
Teacher Recruitment
Teaching
Travel Awareness
Violence at Work
Volunteering
Waste Awareness
Working in the NHS
20 mph Zones

External links
TalkingScotland.com

Politics of Scotland
Scottish Government
Television series by STV Studios